Coleophora glaseri is a moth of the family Coleophoridae. It is found in the Czech Republic, Slovakia, Austria, Hungary and Bulgaria.

The larvae feed on Genista tinctoria. They create a dark brown, ribbed, tubular silken case of about 7 mm length. It has a mouth angle of about 50°.

References

glaseri
Moths described in 1961
Moths of Europe